Semyonovskoye is a rural locality (a village) in Podlesnoye Rural Settlement, Vologodsky District, Vologda Oblast, Russia. The population was 4 as of 2002.

Geography 
The distance to Vologda is 28 km, to Ogarkovo is 15 km. Melnikovo is the nearest rural locality.

References 

Rural localities in Vologodsky District